Williams College is a private liberal arts college in Williamstown, Massachusetts, United States. It was established in 1793 with funds from the estate of Ephraim Williams, a colonist from the Province of Massachusetts Bay who was killed in the French and Indian War in 1755. Alumni of the college are listed below.

Academia

A–F

 Brooke Ackerly 1988, American political scientist and Professor of Political Science at Vanderbilt University
 Peter Adamson 1994, professor of late ancient and Arabic philosophy at the Ludwig Maximilian University of Munich
 Lawrence A. Alexander 1965, Warren Distinguished Professor of constitutional law at University of San Diego
 Robert Z. Aliber 1952, professor emeritus of international economics and finance at the University of Chicago
 Robert S. Anderson 1974, American geomorphologist at the Institute of Arctic and Alpine Research, Fellow of the American Geophysical Union, and distinguished professor at University of Colorado Boulder
 W. H. Locke Anderson 1955, American economist and professor at the University of Michigan; staff economist for the Council of Economic Advisers
 Albert LeRoy Andrews 1899, Professor of Germanic philology and an avocational bryologist at Cornell University
 Richard T. Antoun 1953, anthropologist specializing in Islamic and Middle Eastern studies who was murdered in 2009 by a graduate student at Binghamton University
 Jonathan Arons 1965, American astrophysicist and fellow of the American Physical Society; Professor Emeritus of Astronomy and Physics at University of California, Berkeley
 Bernard Bailyn 1945, Two-time Pulitzer-prize winning early American historian and professor at Harvard University
 Michel Balinski 1954, known for Balinski's theorem; mathematician and economist, winner of the John von Neumann Theory Prize and Lanchester Prize
 Sally Ball 1990, American poet, editor, and professor; instructor at Arizona State University
 Emily Balskus 2002, American chemist and microbiologist; Morris Kahn Associate Professor at Harvard University
 Edward Bartow 1892, professor of chemistry at the University of Iowa; expert on sanitary chemistry
 John Bascom 1849, Williams professor and president of the University of Wisconsin–Madison; namesake of Williams' Bascom House and Bascom Lodge atop Mount Greylock
 Amanda Bayer, 1981, economics professor at Swarthmore College
 James Phinney Baxter III 1914, president of Williams College from 1937–1961 and winner of the Pulitzer Prize for History in 1947; namesake of Williams' Baxter Fellow residential program
 Bruce Beehler 1974, American ornithologist and conservationist at the Smithsonian Institute's Museum of Natural History
 Jere Behrman 1962, William R. Kenan, Jr. professor of economics at the University of Pennsylvania
 David Bellinger 1971, professor of neurology at Harvard Medical School and professor in the Department of Environmental Health at Harvard School of Public Health
 Nathan S. S. Beman 1824, Fourth President of Rensselaer Polytechnic Institute
 Jonathan Berkey 1981, historian and professor of history at Davidson College
 Michael Beschloss 1977, called "the nation's leading presidential historian" by Newsweek
 Norman Birnbaum 1947, American sociologist and emeritus professor at the Georgetown University Law Center
 Daniel I. Bolnick 1996, American professor at the University of Connecticut
 Kimberly D. Bowes 1992, American professor of Classical Studies at the University of Pennsylvania
 Julian Charles Boyd 1952, linguist
 Richard M. Brett 1925, American conservationist and author
 Sterling Allen Brown 1922, African-American teacher, literary critic, and poet
 Harry Gunnison Brown 1904, professor of economics at Yale University; pioneer in the development of mathematical economics and econometrics
 James MacGregor Burns 1939, Pulitzer Prize–winning author
 John C. Campbell 1892, president of Piedmont College, inspiration for John C. Campbell Folk School
 James Hulme Canfield 1869, chancellor of the University of Nebraska, founder of the American Library Institute
 Colin Cannonier 2005, professor of economics at Belmont University; notable sportsman in club soccer and cricket
 Jerry Carlson 1972, documentary film-maker and director of the Cinema Studies program at City University of New York; film-studies professor
 Franklin Carter 1862, American professor of Germanic and Romance Languages; president of Williams College from 1881 to 1901
 Paul Chadbourne 1848, president of University of Wisconsin, Williams College, and University of Massachusetts
 Ross E. Cheit 1977, professor of political science and professor of International and Public Affairs at Brown University's Watson Institute for International and Public Affairs
 Kendrick Clements 1951, American professor of history and presidential historian
 Dan Cohn-Sherbok, rabbi and professor of Jewish theology, University of Wales, Lampeter
 Eliot Coleman 1961, American conservationist and farmer; pioneer of organic and cold-weather farming
 Hardin Coleman, dean of Boston University School of Education
 David Orgon Coolidge, founder of the Marriage Law Project and former professor of law at Catholic University of America
 Robert Coombe 1970, chancellor, University of Denver
 Albert Hewett Coons 1933, professor of pathology and immunology at Harvard Medical School; recipient of 1959 Albert Lasker Award
 Catherine Hirshfeld Crouch 1990, Professor of Physics at Swarthmore College and fellow of the American Physical Society
 Allison Davis 1924, American educator, anthropologist, and professor; first African-American to hold a full faculty position at a major white university (University of Chicago)
 Horace Davis 1848, President of the University of California
 John Aubrey Davis, Sr. 1933, political science professor and civil rights activist instrumental to the Brown vs. Board of Education legal team
 Tyler Dennett 1904, American historian and professor at Johns Hopkins University, Columbia University, and Princeton University; former president of Williams College; winner of the 1934 Pulitzer Prize for Biography or Autobiography
 Anna Christina De Ozorio Nobre 1985, professor of cognitive neuroscience, University of Oxford
 Charles B. Dew 1958, American South historian, professor at Williams College
 Jennifer Doleac 2003, economist of crime and associate professor at Texas A&M University 
 Daniel Drezner 1990, professor at Tufts University, political commentator
 William S. Dudley 1958, naval historian of the United States Navy; director of naval history and director of the Naval Historical Center in Washington, D.C. from 1995 to 2004
 Amos Eaton 1799, co-founder of Rensselaer Polytechnic Institute
 Peter Elbow 1957, professor of English emeritus at the University of Massachusetts Amherst; co-founder of Franconia College; developed the modern "writing process"
 Robert F. Engle 1964, won the 2003 Nobel Prize in Economics "for methods of analyzing economic time series with time-varying volatility" (ARCH models); holds the Armellino Chair at New York University; graduated with highest honors in Physics
 Willard F. Enteman 1959, former president of Bowdoin College
 S. Lane Faison 1929, art historian
 Andrew Guthrie Ferguson 1994, American Professor of Law at American University Washington College of Law
 Louis Fieser 1920, American organic chemist and former professor emeritus at Harvard University
 Christopher Flavin, president emeritus and former president of the Worldwatch Institute
 Kristin Forbes 1992, associate professor of international management at the MIT Sloan School of Management; member of Council of Economic Advisers (confirmed by the United States Senate in 2003, she is the youngest person to ever hold this position) 
 Nathan Fox (psychologist) 1970, American developmental psychologist; Distinguished University Professor of Human Development and Quantitative Methodology at the University of Maryland
 Theodore Friend 1952, former president of Swarthmore College

G–M

 Harry Augustus Garfield 1885, former president of Williams College, lawyer, academic, and supervisor of the Federal Fuel Administration during World War I
 Merrill Edwards Gates 1893, ninth president of Rutgers University and sixth president of Amherst College

 Hans W. Gatzke 1938, historian of German Foreign Policy; awarded Guggenheim Fellowship
 Mary Gehring 1994, American biomedical researcher at Massachusetts Institute of Technology and Whitehead Institute
 John J. Gilbert 1959, Recipient of the 2003 A.C. Redfield Lifetime Achievement Award; major contributor to the fields of ecology and biology
 Michael Goldfield 1965,  American political scientist, author, labor activist, and former student activist; Professor of Political Science at Wayne State University
 Steven Goode, law professor at the University of Texas at Austin
 Luther Carrington Goodrich 1917, prominent American sinologist
 Eban Goodstein 1982, economist, professor, author, and public educator; directs the Center for Environmental Policy and the MBA in Sustainability at Bard College
 Edward Gramlich 1961, economics professor at University of Michigan and member of the Board of Governors of the Federal Reserve
 James C. Greenough 1851, principal of the Rhode Island Normal School, sixth president of the Massachusetts Agricultural College, and seventh principal of the Westfield State Normal School
 Keith Griffin 1960, former president of Magdalen College, Oxford
 Claudio Guillén 1943, professor of comparative literature at Harvard University, University of California, San Diego, and Princeton University
 Elissa Hallem 1999, associate professor of microbiology at the University of California, Los Angeles; 2012 MacArthur Fellowship winner
Ole Andreas Halvorsen 1986, Founder and CEO of Viking Global; billionaire
 Hunt Hawkins 1965, professor at University of South Florida; Poet and winner of the Agnes Lynch Starrett Poetry Prize
 Karl G. Heider 1957, American anthropologist
 John Henry Haynes 1871, American traveller, archaeologist, and photographer; completed extensive archaeological work in the Mediterranean and Mesopotamia at Nippur and Assos
 Joel Hellman, dean of the Edmund A. Walsh School of Foreign Service at Georgetown University; formerly the World Bank's first chief institutional economist
 John Haskell Hewitt 1888, professor of languages; acting president of Williams College
 Catharine Hill 1976, president of Vassar College
 Mahlon Hoagland 1944, former scientific director at Worcester Foundation for Biomedical Research; discovered transfer RNA
 Horace Holley (minister) 1799, former president of Transylvania University
 Juliet Hooker 1994, Nicaraguan political scientist; political philosopher at Brown University
 Henry Hopkins 1858, president of Williams College
 Mark Hopkins 1824; cited in former U.S. president James A. Garfield's description of an ideal college: "Give me a log hut, with only a simple bench, Mark Hopkins on one end and I on the other, and you may have all the buildings..."
 Diane Hughes 1979, professor of applied psychology at New York University
 James Willard Hurst 1932, founder of the modern field of American legal history
 Ishrat Husain 1972, Governor of the State Bank of Pakistan
 Thomas H. Jackson 1972, president of University of Rochester, 1994–2005
 David A. Jaeger 1986, professor in the Ph.D. Program in Economics at the CUNY Graduate Center
 Harry Pratt Judson 1870, president of the University of Chicago, 1906–1923
 Harold L. Kahn 1952, Professor of Chinese History at Stanford University
 Walter Kaufmann 1941, philosopher, poet, and translator
 Charles Stuart Kennedy 1950, founder and current director of the Foreign Affairs Oral History Program at the Association for Diplomatic Studies and Training; oral historian of American diplomats
 Muhammad Kenyatta 1981, American professor, civil rights leader and international human rights advocate
 John Sterling Kingsley 1876, American professor of biology and zoology
 Daniel Kleppner 1953, physicist; National Medal of Science Winner, 2006
 Sally Kornbluth 1982, 18th President of Massachusetts Institute of Technology; former James B. Duke Professor of Pharmacology and Cancer Biology at Duke University School of Medicine; former Provost of Duke University
 Edwin Kuh 1947, American economist and professor at the MIT Sloan School of Management; John Kenneth Galbraith called him "one of the most innovative economists of his generation"
 Leonard Woods Labaree 1920, chair of the history department at Yale and Connecticut State Historian
 Richard Normand Langlois 1974, professor of economics at University of Connecticut
 Frederick M. Lawrence 1977, president, Brandeis University, former dean, George Washington University Law School
 Petra Levin 1989, American microbiologist; Professor in the Department of Biology and co-director of the Plant and Microbial Biosciences Graduate Program at Washington University in St. Louis
 David Levy, American economist
 Ethan G. Lewis 1995, labor economist and associate professor of economics at Dartmouth College
 Marty Linsky, professor at Harvard Kennedy School; co-founder of Cambridge Leadership Associates
 Rayford Logan 1917, professor emeritus of history at Howard University, former chief advisor to the National Association for the Advancement of Colored People (NAACP) on international affairs
 Roger Sherman Loomis 1909, medieval and Arthurian literature scholar
 Margaret D. Lowman 1975, pioneered the science of canopy ecology; director of Global Initiatives and Senior Scientist for Plant Conservation at the California Academy of Sciences
 Brian Lukacher, professor of art history at Vassar College
 James Maas 1961, professor of psychology at Cornell and leading sleep researcher
 Kenneth L. Marcus 1988, founding president of the Louis D. Brandeis Center for Human Rights under Law, professor at Baruch College
 Hamilton Wright Mabie 1867, American essayist, editor, critic, and lecturer
 James Ross MacDonald 1944, Winner of the 1988 IEEE Edison Medal; instrumental in building up the Central Research laboratories of Texas Instruments
 Mark Maroncelli 1979, professor of chemistry at Pennsylvania State University
 Frank Jewett Mather 1889, American art critic; professor of art and archaeology at Princeton
 Curtis T. McMullen 1980, professor of mathematics at Harvard and winner of the 1998 Fields Medal for his work in complex dynamics
 Ernest Addison Moody 1924, professor of philosophy at University of California, Los Angeles, noted medievalist and philosopher
 William Moomaw 1959, professor emeritus of international environmental policy at the Fletcher School of Law and Diplomacy, Tufts University
 Barrington Moore Jr. 1936, leading figure in comparative politics; professor at Harvard
 James F. Moore 1969, pioneer of the "Business ecosystem" concept; Berkman Fellow, Berkman Center for Internet & Society Harvard Law School (2000–2004)
 Terris Moore 1929, second president of the University of Alaska
 Richard Murnane 1966, economist; Juliana W. and William Foss Thompson Professor of Education and Society at the Harvard Graduate School of Education
 Daniel Muzyka 1975, former dean of the Sauder School of Business at the University of British Columbia
 Stewart Myers 1967, professor of financial economics at the MIT Sloan School of Management

N–Z

 Ahmed Naseer 2007, Maldivian economist; State Minister of Finance in the Maldives
 Michael Norton 1997, Harold M. Brierley Professor of Business Administration at Harvard Business School
 C. Stanley Ogilvy 1935, professor of mathematics at Hamilton College; author of books on mathematics and sailing
 Gamaliel S. Olds 1801, professor of mathematics and natural philosophy at Williams College, Amherst College, and University of Vermont
 William Ouchi 1965, professor and author in the field of business management
 Richard C. Overton 1929 (BA), 1934 (MA), American railroad historian; first secretary of the Lexington Group in Transportation History; first president of the Business History Conference
 Robert Oxnam 1964, China scholar; president emeritus of the Asia Society
 Arthur Newton Pack 1913, founder of the American Nature Association
 James T. Patterson 1957, Ford Foundation Professor of History emeritus at Brown University
 Noel Perrin 1949, American essayist and professor at Dartmouth College
 Arthur Latham Perry 1852, economist
 Bliss Perry 1882, American literary critic, writer, editor, and teacher; awarded Legion of Honour by the French
 Lewis Perry 1899, American educator and seventh principal of Phillips Exeter Academy; created the Harkness table teaching method
 Anna L. Peterson, American scholar of religious studies; professor of religion at the University of Florida
 Earl Potter III 1968, president of St. Cloud State University
 James Bissett Pratt 1897, Mark Hopkins Chair of Intellectual and Moral Philosophy at Williams College
 Samuel I. Prime 1829, founder of the New York Association for the Advancement of Science and Art; president and trustee of Wells College; former trustee of Williams College
 Amy Prieto 1996, Professor of Chemistry at Colorado State University; founder and CEO of Prieto Battery
 Phillip Prodger 1989, Senior Research Scholar at the Yale Center for British Art, formerly served as Head of Photographs at the National Portrait Gallery, London
 Jennifer Quinn 1985, professor of mathematics at University of Washington Tacoma and sits on the board of governors of the Mathematical Association of America; former co-editor-in-chief of Math Horizons
 Reginald Ray 1964, American Buddhist academic and teacher; founder of the Dharma Ocean Foundation
 George Lansing Raymond 1862, prominent professor of Aesthetic Criticism at Princeton University from 1881 to 1905; held professorships at George Washington University and Williams College and was nominated for the Nobel Prize in Literature seven times
 Eric Reeves 1972, Sudan scholar
 Tannishtha Reya, Professor of Pharmacology and Medicine at University of California, San Diego 
 Thomas Hedley Reynolds 1942, 5th president of Bates College
 Zalmon Richards 1836, educator, co-founder and first president of the National Education Association
 Steven S. Rogers 1981, senior lecturer at Harvard Business School
 Todd Rogers (behavioral scientist) 1999, Professor of Public Policy at the Harvard Kennedy School
 Steven T. Ross 1959, military historian, held academic positions at University of Nebraska, Williams College, and Yale University; scholar-in-residence at the Central Intelligence Agency
 Mary-Jane Rubenstein 1999, Professor of Religion, Science in Society, and Feminist, Gender, and Sexuality Studies at Wesleyan University and former co-chair of the Philosophy of Religion Unit of the American Academy of Religion
 David Ruder 1951, professor and former dean, Northwestern University School of Law, and former chairman of the U.S. Securities and Exchange Commission
 William Ruddiman 1964, palaeoclimatologist and professor emeritus at the University of Virginia; known for the "early anthropocene" hypothesis
 Bruce Russett 1956, professor of political science at Yale University, leading figure in international relations
 Alexa Sand 1991, professor of art history at Utah State University
 John Edward Sawyer 1939, 11th president of Williams College
 AnnaLee Saxenian 1976, dean of the School of Information at the University of California, Berkeley
 James C. Scott 1958, Sterling Professor of Political Science and director of Agrarian Studies at Yale University
 Ben Ross Schneider, American political scientist and Ford International Professor of Political Science at Massachusetts Institute of Technology
 Samuel Hubbard Scudder 1847, American entomologist and paleontologist; founder of American insect paleontology
 John Setear 1981, Professor of International Law at the University of Virginia School of Law 
 David Newton Sheldon 1830, fifth president of Colby College
 Stuart Sherman 1904, American literary critic
 John Douglas Simon 1979, president of Lehigh University
 Francis H. Snow 1868, chancellor of the University of Kansas
 David Sobel, co-founder of The Harrisville School; director of Certificate Programs at Antioch University
 Samuel Sommers 1997, American social psychologist and associate professor of psychology at Tufts University
 David Spadafora 1972, former president, Lake Forest College, current president, Newberry Library  
 Norman Spaulding 1993, professor of federal civil procedure and professional ethics at Stanford Law School
 Clayton Spencer 1977, president of Bates College, 2011–present  
 Douglas Staiger 1984, John French Professor of Economics at Dartmouth College
 Herbert Stein 1935, former chair, Council of Economic Advisers (and father of Ben Stein)
 Lester Thurow 1960, the Jerome and Dorothy Lemelson Professor of Management and Economics, and former dean (1987–1993), MIT Sloan School of Management
 Paul Hayes Tucker 1972, Art Historian at University of California Santa Barbara, Williams College, the New York University Institute of Fine Arts, Yale University, and the Toledo Museum of Art
 Richard P. Usatine 1978, professor of family and community medicine; national recipient of the Humanism in Medicine Award by the Association of American Medical Colleges
 Carl W. Vogt 1958, former president of Williams College, former chair of the National Transportation Safety Board
 R. Jay Wallace 1979, professor of philosophy at University of California, Berkeley
 Richard Warch 1961, president of Lawrence University
 Henry Augustus Ward 1856, American geologist and naturalist
 Henry Baldwin Ward 1885, American zoologist
 Andrew Weiss 1968, economist, chief executive officer of Weiss Asset Management, and professor emeritus at Boston University
 David Ames Wells 1850, American engineer, economist, and textbook author
 William Dwight Whitney 1849, American linguist, philologist, and lexicographer known for his work on Sanskrit grammar and Vedic philology; first president of the American Philological Association and editor-in-chief of The Century Dictionary
 Eric Widmer 1962, American scholar and educator; founding headmaster of King's Academy in Jordan
 Richard Woodbury 1983, American economist
 John William Yeomans 1828, president of Lafayette College 
 Ethan Zuckerman 1993, director of the MIT Center for Civic Media; founder of Geekcorps and Tripod.com

Actors, architects, artists, and filmmakers
A–M

 Sebastian Arcelus 1999, film and theater actor
 Joanna P. Adler 1986, film and television actress
 Nancy Baker Cahill 1992, multidisciplinary artist
 Alan Baxter 1930, film and television actor
 James Becket 1958, human rights activist and lawyer, filmmaker
 Purva Bedi 1996, film and television actress
 Betsy Beers 1979, American television and film producer
 Eve Biddle 2004, Founder and co-director of The Wassaic Project
 Paul Boocock 1986, film and theater actor, writer 
 Charles William Brackett 1915, Academy Award-winning screenwriter; president of the Academy of Motion Picture Arts and Sciences
 Julia Brown 2000, American artist
 Jerry Carlson 1972, documentary film-maker and director of the Cinema Studies program at City University of New York 
 Gordon Clapp 1971, Emmy Award-winning actor on NYPD Blue
 Bud Collyer, radio actor and game show host
 Edward Cornell 1966, theater director, first managing director of Shakespeare in the Park
 Pamela Council 2007, textile artist
 Monique Curnen 1992, film and television actress
 Robert Dunham 1953, actor, entrepreneur, and racecar driver
 Dave Erickson 2000, American television writer and producer
 Walker Evans, photographer; dropped out
 Sarah Fain 1993, American screenwriter and film producer
 Keith Fowler, faculty 1964–1968, artistic director of the Virginia Museum Theater, the American Revels Company; theater professor at the University of California, Irvine
 Joshua Frankel, American contemporary artist and film director
 John Frankenheimer 1951, director of films including The Manchurian Candidate
 Ulrich Franzen 1943, German-born American architect; designed the Alley Theatre and known for pioneering Brutalist architecture
 Crispin Freeman 1994, voice actor
 John Gallaudet 1925, American film and television actor
 Abram Garfield 1893, architect and founder/first president of the Cleveland School of Architecture
 Max Gail 1965, actor
 A. R. Gurney 1952, playwright, including The Dining Room and Sylvia
 Noah Harlan 1997, independent filmmaker, 2008 Emmy Award winner; founder of Two Bulls
 Jason Hehir 1998, filmmaker, director of The Last Dance
 Robert Hiltzik 1979, film director; directed Sleepaway Camp
 Tao Ho 1960, architect
 Wendy W. Jacob 1980, artist
 Graham Jarvis 1952, Canadian actor
 Liza Johnson 1992, film director and professor of art  
 David Bar Katz 1989, Emmy Award- and Tony Award-nominated theater and television writer and director  
 Elia Kazan 1931, writer and Academy Award-winning director; director of films including On the Waterfront
 Leslie Keno 1979, appraiser for Antiques Roadshow; furniture designer
 Adam LeFevre 1972, American actor
 William F. Lamb 1904, American architect; one of the principal designers of the Empire State Building
 Art Lande 1968, jazz pianist
 Standish Lawder 1958, American artist; contributed to the structural film movement
 Bruce Leddy, television director and producer
 John Bedford Lloyd 1978, American theater and film actor
 Iñigo Manglano-Ovalle 1983, artist
 Carolyn McCormick 1981, actress
 Ralph Eugene Meatyard, attended 1943–1944, photographer
 Meleko Mokgosi, 2007, artist
 Donald Molosi 2007, actor, writer, and playwright
 Jonathan Moscone 1986, theater director
 Karin Muller 1987, polyglot, president of Firelight Productions, and documentary producer
 Richard Murphy 1934, Academy Award-nominated screenwriter
 Eliza Myrie 2003, Black American artist, known for social practice 

N–Z

 Alexandra Neil 1970, American actress
 Kevin O'Rourke (actor) 1978, American actor
 A. Laurie Palmer 1981, American artist, writer, and activist; professor at the School of the Art Institute of Chicago
 Barbara Prey 1979, watercolor artist; member of National Council on the Arts
 Maggie Renzi 1973, American film producer and actress
 Marcus T. Reynolds 1891, American architect known for bank designs; designed the Delaware and Hudson Railroad Company Building and the First Trust Company Building; many buildings listed on the National Register of Historic Places
 Michael Rosenblum 1976, American television producer and video journalist
 John Sayles 1972, Hollywood genre writer and director of independent films including Lone Star and Eight Men Out
 Brad Silberling, American film and television director, writer, and producer of films and shows including "Reign," "Charmed," "City of Angels," and "Casper."
 Peter Simon, stage and television actor
 Eddie Shin 1998, American television actor
 Stephen Sondheim 1950, composer and lyricist for stage and screen; composer for Broadway musical theatre
 Jeff Speck 1985, American city planner, writer, and lecturer
 Fletcher Steele 1907, landscape architect
 Paul Stekler 1974, documentarian
 Jon Stone 1952, writer, director and co-creator of Sesame Street
 David Strathairn 1970, Academy Award-nominated actor
 Paul Stupin 1979, television and film producer 
 Jamie Tarses 1985, television producer and executive
 Jay Tarses 1961, television, film and radio writer, producer and actor
 Sarah Megan Thomas 2001, actress, screenwriter, and producer; known for Equity
 Camille Utterback 1992, interactive installation artist; MacArthur Foundation's "genius award" winner  
 Thomas Vitale 1986, executive vice president of Programming & Original Movies for Syfy and Chiller
 Sydney Walsh 1983, American actress
 Leehom Wang 1998, singer, songwriter, actor, director
 Brian Wecht 1997, American musician
 Martha Williamson 1977, producer, Touched by an Angel
 William Windom (actor) 1946, American actor
 Frederick Wiseman 1951, Academy Award winning director of documentaries including Titicut Follies
 John F. Wharton 1916, American lawyer with a notable impact on developing the theater business in the United States

Business
A–M

 John Ackerly 1997, CEO and co-founder of Virtru
 Javed Ahmed 1982, chief executive office, Tate & Lyle
 Samuel Thomas Alexander, co-founded major agricultural and transportation businesses in the Kingdom of Hawaii
 Tariq Al Sudairy 1999, chief executive officer, Jadwa Investment
 Herbert A. Allen, Jr. 1962, president and chief executive officer of Allen & Company, a privately held investment firm and host of a storied annual media conference in Sun Valley, Idaho, billionaire
 William Fessenden Allen 1850, American businessman in the Kingdom of Hawaii
 Wallace Barnes 1949, former chairman and chief executive officer of the Barnes Group
 Charles Tracy Barney 1858, president of the Knickerbocker Trust Company, a prominent New York trust which failed in the Panic of 1907
 Jess Beck 2007, entrepreneur and co-founder of Hello Alfred
 Quincy Bent 1901, Vice President of Bethlehem Steel
 Arnold Bernhard 1923, founder and CEO of Value Line
 Robert A. Bernhard 1951, American banker and partner of Lehman Brothers and Salomon Brothers
 R. C. Bhargava, former CEO and current chairman of Indian automobile company Maruti Suzuki
 Edgar Bronfman, Sr. 1950, chairman and CEO of Seagram Company Inc (the international beverage conglomerate and parent company of Warner Music and Universal Pictures), billionaire
 Matthew Bronfman 1981, CEO of BHB Holdings and chairman of Limmud FSU
 Stephen Bronfman 1986, CEO of Claridge
 William Robinson Brown 1897, Corporate officer of the Brown Company and Arabian horse breeder
 Bruce Bullen 1970, government and health care executive; former CEO of Harvard Pilgrim Health Care, Inc.
 Oliver Prince Buel 1859, American lawyer and banker; founding trustee of the Metropolitan Trust Company
 Steve Case 1980, founder and former CEO of America Online, billionaire
 Edward G. Chace 1905, American businessman and entrepreneur in textile manufacturing
 Edward Cabot Clark 1830, American businessman and co-founder of the Singer Corporation with Isaac Singer
 Charles Payson Coleman Sr. 1948, American lawyer, managing partner of Davis Polk & Wardwell (1977–1982)
 Chase Coleman III 1997, founder and president of Tiger Global Management, billionaire
 Toby Cosgrove 1962, CEO of the Cleveland Clinic
 Peter Currie 1978, president of Currie Capital and former CFO of Netscape
 John D'Agostino 1997, youngest VP in history of New York Mercantile Exchange, and subject of the Ben Mezrich book Rigged, the True Story of an Ivy League Kid who Changed the World of Oil
 Fairleigh Dickinson Jr. 1941, president and chairman of Becton Dickinson
 Joseph Oriel Eaton II 1895, founder of Eaton Corporation
 Michael R. Eisenson 1977, founder and CEO of Charlesbank Capital Partners
 Alexander Falck 1899, American businessman; former director of Chemung Canal Trust Company and former president of Corning Inc. (1920–1928)
 Neil Fiske 1984, president and CEO of Eddie Bauer
 Paul Fitchen 1922, Federal Reserve Bank
 Alex Fort Brescia, co-chairman of Grupo Breca and chairman of BBVA Continental
 Adena Friedman 1991, president of NASDAQ OMX
 Harry Augustus Garfield 1885, co-founder of the Cleveland Trust Company, the precursor to KeyBank
 Mark Gerson 1994, co-founder and chairman of Gerson Lehrman Group
 Richard Georgi 1985, American real estate financier and investor
 Theodore P. Gilman 1862, American banker and railroad executive; published the original plan for the creation of the Federal Reserve System
 Kenard Gibbs 1986, chief executive officer of Soul Train Holdings and MadVision Entertainment
 David Gow 1985, owner and chairman of Gow Broadcasting and Yahoo Sports Radio
 Don Graves 1992, American investment banker
 Harry Hagey 1963, former chief executive officer and chairman of Dodge & Cox
 Ole Andreas Halvorsen 1986, founder and chief investment officer of Viking Global Investors, billionaire
 Walter Foxcroft Hawkins 1884, former vice president of Berkshire Life Insurance Company
 Peter deCourcy Hero 1964, philanthropy consultant
 George Washington Hill 1904, former president of American Tobacco Company
 Hale Holden 1890, former president of Chicago, Burlington and Quincy Railroad; served as a director at American Telephone & Telegraph, New York Life Insurance Company, and the Chemical Bank & Trust
 Willem J. "Hans" Humes 1987, founder and chief investment officer of Greylock Capital Management
 James C. Kellogg III 1937, chairman of Port Authority of New York and New Jersey and chairman of the board of governors of the New York Stock Exchange; youngest person to be elected chairman of the New York Stock Exchange; former partner of Spear, Leeds & Kellogg
 Muhoho Kenyatta 1985, CEO of Brookside Dairy Limited, former vice-chairperson of the Commercial Bank of Africa Group
 Donald S. Klopfer, American publisher and co-founder of Random House
 Jonathan Kraft 1986, president of The Kraft Group, president of New England Patriots, owner of New England Revolution, billionaire
 Daniel W. Layman Jr. 1929, one of the creators of Monopoly
 James B. Lee 1975, vice chairman of JPMorgan Chase Bank, N.A.
 Herbert H. Lehman 1899, co-founder and former CEO of Lehman Brothers Investment Bank, Governor and U.S Senator for New York
 David Levy, chairman of the Jerome Levy Forecasting Center LLC
 Robert I. Lipp 1960, chairman and CEO of Travelers Property Casualty Corp., former president of Chemical Bank
 Ramon Lopez (businessman) 1988, former president and CEO of the RFM Corporation
 Herbert Louis 1950, American billionaire and philanthropist
 John Jeffry Louis III 1985, Chairman of Gannett; Board Member of Olayan Group; S. C. Johnson & Son, Inc; Chairman of the Fulbright Commission
 Demetri Marchessini 1956, Greek businessman and political pundit
 John B. McCoy 1965, former CEO of Bank One
 Ajata "AJ" Mediratta 1987, co-president at Greylock Capital Management
 Nancy Melcher, women's fashion designer specializing in lingerie
 Peter Monroe 1965, CEO of the Resolution Trust Corporation and of National Real Estate Ventures; COO of the Federal Housing Administration; Republican US Senate Candidate from Florida

N–Z

 Mariam Naficy 1991, founder and CEO of Eve.com and Minted
 Vineet Nayyar 1971, CEO of Tech Mahindra, Chairman of Mahindra Satyam
 Matthew Nimetz 1960, former chief operating officer of General Atlantic
 Robert Nutting 1983, chairman of the board and principal owner of Pittsburgh Pirates; chairman and CEO of Odgen Newspapers and Nutting Newspapers, billionaire
 William Oberndorf 1975, managing director of SPO Partners, prominent conservative donor, billionaire
 Mike Onoja 1976, Nigerian philanthropist, entrepreneur, and politician
 George Oppenheimer 1922, American playwright and founder of The Viking Press
 Clarence Otis, Jr. 1977, CEO of Darden Restaurants
 Roland Palmedo 1917, investment banker at Lehman Brothers; founder of the Mad River Glen ski area, co-founder of National Ski Patrol
 David Paresky 1960, former president of Thomas Cook Travel, billionaire
 Patrick S. Parker 1951, former CEO and chairman of Parker Hannifin
 Bo Peabody 1994, founder of Tripod (sold to Lycos in 1998 for $64 million) and chairman of Village Ventures
 Peter Allen Peyser 1976, American public affairs consultant
 Gerald Phipps 1936, construction company founder; owner of the Denver Broncos
 Richardson Pratt Jr 1946, chairman of Charles Pratt&Company, president of the Pratt Institute
 Jason Priest 1991, American tech and hospitality executive
 Amy Prieto 1996, Professor of Chemistry at Colorado State University; founder and CEO of Prieto Battery
 Mitchell Reiss 1979, president and CEO of Colonial Williamsburg Foundation
 Caleb Rice 1814, first president of MassMutual, a now Fortune 100 company
 Joseph L. Rice III 1954, founder of Clayton, Dubilier & Rice, Inc., private equity investment firm and Trustee Emeritus of Williams College
 Robert E. Rich Jr. 1963, majority owner and chairman of Rich Products, billionaire
 Michael Roizen 1967, physician and medical entrepreneur; founder of RealAge and other medical companies; chief wellness officer at the Wellness Institute at the Cleveland Clinic
 Robert Scott 1968, former president and chief operating officer of Morgan Stanley
 Mayo Shattuck III 1976, president and CEO of Constellation Energy Group and former chairman of Alex Brown, LLC
 John A. Shaw 1962, CEO / president of the American Overseas Clinic Corporation
 Elissa Shevinsky 2001, serial entrepreneur in security technology
 Walter V. Shipley 1957, former president of Chemical Bank
 William Pratt Sidley 1889, former managing partner 
 Henry R. Silverman 1961, chairman and CEO of Cendant Corporation
 Bill Simon 1973, founder of William Simon & Sons, a global merchant bank
 Mark Sisson 1975, CEO of Primal Nutrition
 George Steinbrenner 1952, owner of the New York Yankees
 Hal Steinbrenner 1991, principal owner, managing general partner and co-chairman of the New York Yankees, billionaire
 William Sullivan 1993, chief financial officer of Applied Genetic Technologies Corporation
 Tarek Sultan 1986, CEO and Vice Chairman of Agility Logistics
 Jamie Tarses 1985, former president, ABC Entertainment
 Mark Tercek 1979, former president and CEO of The Nature Conservancy (2008–2019)
 Grace Paine Terzian 1974, chief communications officer of MediaDC, the parent company of The Washington Examiner and The Weekly Standard
 Frederick Ferris Thompson 1854, bank founder
 Frederick K. Thun 1928, one of the creators of Monopoly
 Louis R. Thun 1928, one of the creators of Monopoly
 John van Eck 1936, founder and CEO of Van Eck Global
 Fay Vincent 1960, eighth commissioner of Major League Baseball, former chairman of Columbia Pictures
 Elizabeth Visconti 2013, founder and president of LizViscontiSolutions.com, a leading provider of business solutions
 Edgar Wachenheim III 1959, American investor and philanthropist, CEO/Founder of Greenhaven Associates
 Michael Weiner 1983, executive director of Major League Baseball Players Association
 Andrew Weiss 1968, economist and chief executive officer of Weiss Asset Management
 Peter Booth Wiley 1964, chairman of John Wiley & Sons
 Clark Williams 1892, American banker and politician
 Peter Willmott 1959, former president and chief operating officer of FedEx, former C.E.O. of Carson Pirie Scott and Zenith Electronics; chairman of the Children's Memorial Hospital, Chicago
 Jonah Wittkamper, co-founder and global director of Nexus Global Youth Summit; entrepreneur
 Selim Zilkha 1946, entrepreneur and philanthropist
 Chris Zook 1973, business writer and head of Bain & Company's Global Strategy Practice
 Ethan Zuckerman 1993, director of the MIT Center for Civic Media; founder of Geekcorps and Tripod.com

Curators, archaeologists and museum directors

 Gantuya Badamgarav, Mongolian art curator and founder of Art Space 976+ in Ulaanbaatar, Mongolia
 Brent Benjamin 1986, director, St. Louis Art Museum
 Johnson Chang 1973, curator and director of contemporary Chinese art galleries in Hong Kong and Taiwan
 John W. Coffey 1978, deputy director, North Carolina Museum of Art
 Anna Cohn 1972, Judaic scholar and museum curator
 Michael Govan 1985, director, Los Angeles County Museum of Art
 John Henry Haynes 1871, American traveller, archaeologist, and photographer; completed extensive archaeological work in the Mediterranean and Mesopotamia at Nippur and Assos
 Sam Hunter 1943, founding director, Rose Art Museum; director, Poses Institute for the Fine Arts; director, Jewish Museum; acting director, Minneapolis Institute of the Arts  
 Benjamin Ives Gilman 1880, secretary of the Boston Museum of Fine Arts
 Thomas Krens 1969, director, Guggenheim Museums Worldwide
 George Kuwayama 1947, American curator who spent most of his career at the Los Angeles County Museum of Art
 John R. Lane 1966, director of the San Francisco Museum of Modern Art (1987–1997)
 Chaédria LaBouvier 2007, Black American curator and journalist; first Black exhibition curator at the Guggenheim
 Victoria Sancho Lobis 2002, director of the Benton Museum of Art
 Glenn D. Lowry 1976, director of the Museum of Modern Art, New York City
 Roger Mandle 1963, executive director of Qatar Museums Authority, former deputy director and chief curator, National Gallery of Art and president, RISD
 Frank Jewett Mather 1889, American art critic; professor of art and archaeology at Princeton
 Shamim M. Momin 1995, head of Los Angeles Nomadic Division and adjunct curator for Whitney Museum of Art
 Charles Percy Parkhurst 1935, director of the Baltimore Museum of Art, chief curator of the National Gallery of Art, and one of the "monuments men" 
 Earl A. Powell III 1966, director of the National Gallery of Art 1992–present
 Phillip Prodger 1989, Senior Research Scholar at the Yale Center for British Art, formerly served as Head of Photographs at the National Portrait Gallery, London
 Edgar Preston Richardson 1925, art historian and director of the Detroit Institute of Arts and Winterthur Museum, Garden and Library
 Whitney Stoddard 1935, notable chair of Williams College's art department
 Alexandra Suda 2005, director of the National Gallery of Canada
 Joseph C. Thompson 1981, director of the Massachusetts Museum of Contemporary Art
 Paul Hayes Tucker 1972, Set the attendance record at the Boston Museum of Fine Arts; curator and art historian
 Kirk Varnedoe 1968, chief curator of painting and sculpture, Museum of Modern Art, until his death in 2003
 Arthur K. Wheelock Jr. 1965, curator of the Northern European Art Collection at the National Gallery of Art
 J. Keith Wilson 1978, associate director and curator of Ancient Chinese art at the Freer Gallery of Art and the Arthur M. Sackler Gallery at the Smithsonian Institution
 James N. Wood 1963, former director and president of the Art Institute of Chicago (1980–2004); December 2006: Named President and CEO of the J. Paul Getty Trust

Government officials and political notables

Ambassadors, diplomats, and bureaucrats

 Alice P. Albright 1983, CEO of the Millennium Challenge Corporation
 Elisha Hunt Allen 1823, American diplomat to the Kingdom of Hawaii
 Daniel Dewey Barnard 1818, United States Envoy to Prussia
 James Phinney Baxter III 1914, director of the Office of Strategic Services
 Don Beyer 1971, United States Ambassador to Switzerland and Liechtenstein
 William D. Brewer 1943, United States Ambassador to Mauritius (1970–1973), United States Ambassador to Sudan (1973–1977)
 Philip Marshall Brown 1897, American diplomat
 Henry E. Catto Jr. 1952, United States Information Agency director and former United States Ambassador to the United Kingdom
 Warren Clark Jr. 1958, United States Ambassador to Gabon and United States Ambassador to Sao Tome and Principe (1987–1989)
 Victoria Coates, special assistant to the president and senior director for strategic assessments on the United States National Security Council; National Security Advisor to Ted Cruz's 2016 presidential campaign
 Charles Burke Elbrick 1929, career ambassador; United States Ambassador to Brazil (1969–1970), United States Ambassador to Yugoslavia (1964–1969), and United States Ambassador to Portugal (1959–1963)
 Steven Fagin, current designate to be the United States Ambassador to Yemen
 James Gilfillan 1856, thirteenth treasurer of the United States
 Donald Gregg 1951, former national security advisor to Vice President Bush and ambassador to South Korea; president and chairman of the Korea Society
 Richard Helms 1935, former Central Intelligence Agency director and ambassador to Iran
 William Henry Hunt 1885, former slave who served in the American diplomatic corps during the 19th century; served posts in France, Portugal, and Liberia
 James C. Humes 1957, presidential speechwriter for Nixon; co-authored text of the Apollo 11 Lunar plaque
 Hallett Johnson 1908, ambassador to Costa Rica
 Elsie S. Kanza 2000, Tanzanian ambassador to the United States (2021-)
 Arthur Levitt Jr. 1952, chairman of the U.S. Securities and Exchange Commission (1993–2001)
Jon Lovett, former assistant director of speechwriting for President Obama and former speechwriter for then Senator Clinton
 John J. Louis Jr. 1949, ambassador to the United Kingdom
 Jeb Magruder 1958, political operative for the GOP and Richard Nixon's re-election committee; served prison time for conspiracy
 Carl Marzani 1935, served in the federal intelligence agency, the Office of Strategic Services, and the U.S. Department of State
 William Green Miller, United States Ambassador to Ukraine (1993–1998)
 Richard Moe 1959, chief of staff for Vice President Walter Mondale and president of the National Trust for Historic Preservation
 Matthew Nimetz 1960, American diplomat
 Phelps Phelps 1922, ambassador to Dominican Republic and 38th governor of American Samoa
 Ganson Purcell 1927, chairman of the U.S. Securities and Exchange Commission (1942–1946)
 Mitchell Reiss 1979, senior American diplomat and former director of Policy Planning at the United States Department of State
 David Sturtevant Ruder 1951, chairman of the U.S. Securities and Exchange Commission (1987–1989)
 Miriam Sapiro 1981, United States Trade Representative
 Francis Bowes Sayre Sr. 1909, High Commissioner to the Philippines
 Susan Schwab 1976, U.S. Trade Representative (2006–2009), former dean, University of Maryland School of Public Policy
 Douglas H. Shulman 1989, Commissioner of Internal Revenue
 Cheryl Marie Stanton, Administrator of the Wage and Hour Division, United States Department of Labor; awarded the Order of the Palmetto
 David A. Starkweather 1824, United States Ambassador to Chile
 Eric Stein, Deputy Assistant Secretary for Commerce Protection at the U.S. Department of Treasury
 Herbert Stein 1936, chairman of the Council of Economic Advisors
 Paul A. Trivelli 1974, U.S. Ambassador to Nicaragua (2005–2008)
 Carl W. Vogt 1958, former president of Williams College, former chair of the National Transportation Safety Board
 Wahidullah Waissi 2005, Afghan Ambassador to Fiji, Australia
 Philip C. Wilcox Jr. 1958, American diplomat and Coordinator for Counterterrorism

Governors and state politicians

 Navjeet Bal 1984, general counsel of Nixon Peabody's Public Finance group; former commissioner of Revenue for Massachusetts
 Richard H. Balch 1921, former chairman of New York State Democratic Committee and campaign manager
 Erastus Newton Bates 1853, Illinois Treasurer (1869–1873)
 Don Beyer 1972, Lieutenant Governor of Virginia and Ambassador to Switzerland, Congressman from Virginia (since 2015)
 Luther Bradish 1804, Lieutenant Governor of New York, Assistant United States Treasurer
 Henry Shaw Briggs 1844, 8th Massachusetts Auditor
 William Bross 1838, 16th Lieutenant Governor of Illinois, early member of the Republican Party
 Arne Carlson 1957, 37th governor of Minnesota
 Henry H. Childs 1802, 16th lieutenant governor of Massachusetts (1843–1844); president of Berkshire Medical College
 Martha Coakley 1975, Massachusetts Attorney General
 Henry Alexander Scammell Dearborn 1801, 9th Adjutant General of Massachusetts
 Sanford Dole 1867, governor of Territory of Hawaii
 Alfred E. Driscoll 1925, 60th governor of New Jersey
 Joseph B. Ely 1902, 58th governor of Massachusetts
 Theodore P. Gilman 1862, New York State Comptroller (1900–1903)
 John Z. Goodrich 1848, 24th Lieutenant Governor of Massachusetts
 Philip Hoff 1948, 73rd governor of Vermont
 Doug Hoffer 1973, Vermont State Auditor and policy analyst
 Jacob M. Howard 1830, Attorney General of Michigan (1855–1860)
 Henry Hoyt 1849, 18th governor of Pennsylvania
 Joseph A. Johnson 1939, member of the Virginia House of Delegates (1974–1983)
 John C. Keeler 1873, Deputy Attorney General of New York (1882–1883)
 William C. Kittredge 1821, Lieutenant Governor of Vermont from 1852 to 1853
 Herbert H. Lehman 1899, 49th governor of New York; co-founder of Lehman Brothers
 Marty Linsky, chief secretary/counselor to Governor William Weld
 John G. McMynn 1848, superintendent of public instruction of Wisconsin, educator
 James Miller 1803, first governor of Arkansas Territory, and a brigadier general in the United States Army during the War of 1812
 Matthias Nicoll Jr. 1889, American physician and New York State Health Commissioner
 Chap Petersen 1990, 2008 Virginia State Senator 34th District, 2005 candidate for Lieutenant Governor of Virginia
 Phelps Phelps, 38th Governor of American Samoa and United States Ambassador to the Dominican Republic (died 1981)
 John S. Robinson 1824, 22nd governor of Vermont
 F. Joseph Sensenbrenner Jr. 1970, Deputy Attorney General, State of Wisconsin (1977–1983); Chief of Staff, Office of the Governor, State of Wisconsin (1975–1977)
 Bill Simon 1973, two-time California gubernatorial candidate
 Walker Stapleton 1996, Colorado State Treasurer
 Charles Stebbins 1807, Lieutenant Governor of New York
 Charles Warren Stone 1863, Lieutenant Governor of Pennsylvania
 Bruce Sundlun 1946, 69th governor of Rhode Island
 Samuel A. Talcott 1809, Attorney General of New York (1821–1829)
 Nathaniel Tallmadge 1814, last governor of the Territory of Wisconsin
 Joseph Tucker 1851, Lieutenant Governor of Massachusetts (1869–1873)
 Stephen H. Urquhart 1989, Utah State Legislator 2001-current
 Gilbert Carlton Walker 1854, 43rd governor of Virginia
 Oliver Warner 1842, Massachusetts Secretary of the Commonwealth
 Emory Washburn 1817, 27th governor of Massachusetts
 Charles S. Whitman 1890, 44th governor of New York
 Charles Williams 1800, 20th governor of Vermont
 Clark Williams 1892, New York State Comptroller 
 William Durkee Williamson 1804, 2nd governor of Maine

Legislature (state and national)
A–F

 Josiah Gardner Abbott, US Representative for the Massachusetts Fourth Congressional District
 Elisha Hunt Allen 1823, Maine First Congressional District (1841–1843) 
 Chester Ashley 1811(?), Arkansas Senator (1844–1848)
 Henry W. Austin 1886, Representative in Illinois House of Representatives (1903–1909), Representative in Illinois State Senate (1915–1923)
 Daniel Barnard 1818, New York Congressman (1827–1829, 1839–1845) 
 Wallace Barnes 1949, former Connecticut state senator
 Erastus Newton Bates 1853, member of the Illinois House of Representatives
 Erastus C. Benedict 1821, New York state politician; member of both New York State Assembly and New York State Senate
 Samuel Betts 1806, New York Congressman (1815–1817) 
 Lewis Bigelow 1803, Massachusetts Congressman (1821–1823) 
 Victory Birdseye 1804, New York Congressman (1815–1817)  
 Bernard Blair 1825, New York Congressman (1841–1843) 
 Prescott E. Bloom 1964, Illinois State Senator (1975–1986)
 Samra Brouk 2008, Member of the New York State Senate from the 55th district (2021-)
 Samuel Augustus Bridges 1826, Pennsylvania Congressman (1848-–1849, 1853–1855, 1877–1879) 
 Edward Espenett Case 1975, Hawaii Second Congressional District (2003–2007), Hawaii First Congressional District (2019–present)  
 Alfred Clark Chapin 1869, New York Congressman (1891–1892) 
 Timothy Childs 1811, New York Congressman (1829–1831, 1835–1839, 1841–1843) 
 Horace Francis Clark 1833, New York Congressman (1857–1861) 
 John C. Clark 1811, New York Congressman (1827–1829, 1837–1843) 
 Ernest Harold Cluett 1896, New York Congressman (1937–1943) 
 Ralph Cole 1936, member of the Ohio House of Representatives
 Joseph S. Curtis 1853, member of the Wisconsin State Assembly; lawyer and soldier in the Union Army
 Stephen B. Cushing 1832, member of the New York State Assembly and New York State Attorney General
 David Davis IV 1928, Illinois State Senator from 1953 to 1967
 Horace Davis 1848, Member of the U.S. House of Representatives from California's 1st congressional district (1877–1881)
 Henry Alexander Scammell Dearborn 1801, Member of the U.S. House of Representatives from Massachusetts's 10th district
 David S. Dennison Jr. 1940, United States Representative of 11th Ohio Congressional District (1957–1959)
 Rodolphus Dickinson 1821, United States Representative of Ohio's 6th congressional district (1847 – died in office on March 20, 1849)
 Fairleigh Dickinson Jr. 1941, member of the New Jersey Senate
 Michael Dively, Michigan state representative and gay rights activist (born 1938).
 James Dixon 1834, Connecticut Congressman (1845–1849) and Senator (1857–1869) 
 Michael Edward Driscoll 1877, New York Congressman (1899–1913) 
 Frederick E. Draper 1895, Represented 31st Senate District in New York Senate
 Henry Williams Dwight 1809(?), Massachusetts Congressman (1821–1831) 
 Justin Dwinell, US Representative of New York's 22nd congressional district (1823–1825)
 Steve Farley 1985, Arizona State Senator (2013–present) and Arizona State Representative (2007-2013)
 Martin Finch (New York politician) 1837, New York State Assemblyman (1860-1861)
 Orin Fowler 1813, Member of the U.S. House of Representatives from Massachusetts's 9th district

G–M

 William H. Gest 1860, Illinois Congressman (1887–1891) and judge
 Charles W. Gilchrist 1958, Maryland State Senator
 Andy Goodell 1976, New York State Congressman
 Charles Ellsworth Goodell 1948, New York Congressman and Senator (1959–1971) 
 John Z. Goodrich 1848, member of the US House of Representatives from Massachusetts (1851–1855)
 Robert M. Gordon 1972, member of the New Jersey Senate from the 38th district
 Byram Green 1808, New York Congressman (1843–1845) and co-founder of the American missionary movement 
 Henry Hosford Gurley 1810, Member of the U.S. House of Representatives from Louisiana's 2nd district (1823–1831)
 Aaron Hackley, Jr. 1805, New York Congressman (1819–1821) 
 Osee M. Hall 1868, U.S. Representative from Minnesota's 3rd congressional district (1891–1895), State Senator in Minnesota Senate
 Moses Hayden 1804, New York Congressman (1823–1827) 
 Abner Hazeltine 1815, New York Congressman (1833–1837) 
 Jonathan Healy 1967, Massachusetts State Congressman (1971–1993)
 John P. Hiler 1975, Indiana Congressman (1981–1991) 
 Phineas Hitchcock 1855, United States Senator from Nebraska (1871–1877), Delegate to the U.S. House of Representatives from Nebraska Territory (1865–1867)
 Myron Holley 1799, member of the New York State Assembly (1816, 1820–21); played a large role in the construction of the Erie Canal; namesake of Holley, New York
 Jacob M. Howard 1830, member of the US House of Representatives (representing 1st Michigan District) and US Senate from Michigan
 Edward Swift Isham 1857, member of the Illinois House of Representatives (1864–1866)
 John James Ingalls 1855, Kansas Senator (1873–1891) 
 Ferris Jacobs, Jr. 1856, New York Congressman (1881–1883) 
 Joseph A. Johnson 1939, member of the Virginia House of Delegates (1974–1983)
 John C. Keeler 1873, member of New York State Assembly (1891, 1892)
 Edward Aloysius Kenney 1906, New Jersey Congressman (1933–1938) 
 Steve Kelley 1975, former Minnesota state senator
 John E. Kingston 1948, member of the New York State Assembly from 1960 to 1974
 William C. Kittredge 1821, member and former Speaker of the Vermont House of Representatives
 Samuel Knox 1836, Missouri Congressman (1864–1865) 
 Addison Henry Laflin 1843, New York Congressman (1865–1871) 
 Abraham Lansing 1855, member of the New York State Senate (1882–1883)
 Andy Levin 1983, Michigan Congressman (2019-present)
 Ellen Cogen Lipton 1988, member of the Michigan House of Representatives for the 27th District
 Henry C. Martindale 1800, New York Congressman (1823–1831, 1831–1835) 
 William H. Maynard 1810, member of the New York State Senate Fifth District; sat on the 52nd-55th New York State Legislatures
 Robert McClellan 1825, New York Congressman (1837–1839, 1841–1843) 
 Stephen C. Millard 1865, New York Congressman (1883–1887) 
 Clement Woodnutt Miller 1940, Member of the U.S. House of Representatives from California's 1st district (1959–1962)
 Elijah H. Mills 1797, Massachusetts Congressman (1815–1819) and Senator (1820–1827) 
 Peter Monroe 1965, Republican US Senate Candidate from Florida
 Ernest E. Moore 1906, Speaker of the Vermont House of Representatives (1935–1937)
 Chris Murphy 1996, U.S. Senator (since 2013); Connecticut Congressman (2007–2013) 
 Paul Murphy 1954, Massachusetts State Representative and Federal Judge

N–Z

 Josiah T. Newcomb 1892, member of the New York State Assembly and New York State Senate
 Henry F. C. Nichols 1859, member of the Wisconsin State Assembly
 David A. Noble 1825, United States Representative for the 2nd Congressional District of Michigan
 Jesse O. Norton 1835, Illinois Congressman (1853–1857, 1863–1865) and United States Attorney for Northern Illinois
 Abram B. Olin 1835, New York Congressman (1857–1863) and judge 
 Frank C. Osmers, Jr., New Jersey Congressman (1939–1941, 1951–1965) 
 John G. Otis, Kansas Congressman (1891–1893) 
 Alonzo C. Paige 1812, New York State Congressman; member of the New York State Assembly (1827–1830) and the New York State Senate (1837–1842)
 John Palmer, ca. 1810, U.S. Congressman from New York (1817–1819 and 1837–1839)
 Bishop Perkins 1807, member of the United States House of Representatives from New York's 17th District (1853–1855); member of the New York State Assembly (1846–1849)
 Job Pierson, New York Congressman (1831–1835) 
James Porter 1810, New York Congressman (1817–1819) 
John Porter 1810, member of the New York State Senate (1843–1846)
Orlando B. Potter 1845, member of the United States House of Representatives from New York City (New York's 11th District) from 1883 to 1885; established the National Banking Act in the United States
Jason Priest 1980, member of the Montana State Senate (2011–2015)
Almon Heath Read 1811, member of the U.S. House of Representatives from Pennsylvania's 17th, 12th Congressional Districts (1842–1843, 1843–1844)
Caleb Rice 1814, mayor of Springfield, Massachusetts and member of the Massachusetts House of Representatives; first president of MassMutual
Harvey Rice 1824, member of the Ohio State Senate (1851–1853)
Elijah Rhoades 1813, member of the New York State Senate (1841–1844) from the 7th District
 Edward Rogers 1809, New York Congressman (1839–1841) 
 Henry W. Seymour 1855, Michigan Congressman (1888–1889) 
 Jonathan Sloane 1812, Ohio Congressman (1833–1837) 
 Horace B. Smith 1847, New York Congressman (1871–1875) and Justice of New York Supreme Court 
 George N. Southwick 1884, New York Congressman (1895–1899, 1901–1911)
 James Spallone 1987, Connecticut State Representative from the 36th District (2000–2011)
 David A. Starkweather 1824, U.S. Representative from Ohio's 18th District (1839–1841, 1845–1847); member of the Ohio House of Representatives and Ohio State Senate
 Chris Stearns, Washington state representative from the 47th Distirct (2022-present)
 Charles Stebbins 1807, New York State Senator from the 5th District (1826–1829)
 John B. Steele 1836, New York Congressman (1861–1865) 
 Francis Lynde Stetson, New York representative in the 28th U. S. Congress
 Charles Warren Stone 1863, Member of the U.S. House of Representatives from Pennsylvania's 27th district (1890–1899)
 Solomon Strong 1798, Massachusetts Congressman (1815–1819)
 Gaye Symington 1976, Speaker of the Vermont House of Representatives (2005–2009), Member of the Vermont House of Representatives (1996–2009)
 Egbert Ten Eyck 1799, member of the U.S. House of Representatives; member of the New York State Assembly
 Martin I. Townsend 1833, U.S. House of Representatives member from New York's 17th congressional district (1875–1879)
 Joseph Tucker 1851, Massachusetts State Senator and State Representative
 James H. Tuthill 1846, American lawyer, member of the New York State Assembly
 Mark Udall 1972, Colorado Congressman (1999–2009) and Senator (2009–2015) 
 Christopher C. Upson 1851, U.S. House of Representatives member from Texas's 6th District
 Samuel Finley Vinton 1814, Ohio Congressman (1823–1836, 1843–1851) 
 Jonathan Vipond 1967, Pennsylvania Congressman in the Pennsylvania House of Representatives
 William Walaska 1968, member of the Rhode Island Senate (1995–2003, 2003–2017)
 Ebenezer Walden 1799, member of the New York State Assembly
 Oliver Warner 1842, member of the Massachusetts Senate and Massachusetts House of Representatives
 George B. Wellington 1878, member of the New York State Senate (1916–1918)
 Chris West (politician) 1972, member of the Maryland State Senate (2019-)
 Charles K. Williams 1800, member of the Vermont House of Representatives
 Seward H. Williams 1892, U.S. House of Representatives member from Ohio's 14th District (1915–1917); member of the Ohio House of Representatives
 Austin Eli Wing 1814, U.S. House of Representatives member from Michigan Territory (1825–1829, 1831–1833)
 Richard Woodbury 1983, member of the Maine Senate from the 11th district (2010–2014)
 William Lowndes Yancey (member of the class of 1833 but did not graduate), Alabama Congressman (1844–1846) and Confederate Senator from Alabama (1862–1863)

Municipal

 Francis W. H. Adams 1925, served as the New York City Police Commissioner from 1954 to 1955
 Thomas Bernard 1992, Mayor of North Adams, Massachusetts (2018–Present)
 Stephen Decatur Bross 1830, pioneer settler in Nebraska and Colorado; namesake of Decatur, Nebraska
 Henry Perrin Coon 1844, Mayor of San Francisco, California (1863–1867)
 Gordon Davis 1963, first commissioner of Parks and Recreation in New York City; founding chairman of Jazz at Lincoln Center; founding trustee of the Central Park Conservancy
 Walter Foxcroft Hawkins 1884, American attorney and former Mayor of Pittsfield (1896–1897)
 Robert H. Jeffrey 1895, Mayor of Columbus, Ohio (1903–1906)
 Elisha Johnson, Mayor of Rochester, New York (1838)
 William MacVane 1937, Mayor of Portland, Maine (1971), surgeon, and recipient of the Bronze Star during World War II
 Michael McGinn 1982, Mayor of Seattle, Washington (since 2009)
 Henry F. C. Nichols 1859, mayor of New Lisbon, Wisconsin
 F. Joseph Sensenbrenner Jr. 1970, mayor of Madison, Wisconsin from 1983 to 1989
 Ebenezer Walden 1799, mayor of Buffalo, New York
 Kevin White 1952, Mayor of Boston, Massachusetts (1968–1983)

Presidents, prime ministers, and cabinet positions

 Fakhruddin Ahmed, chief advisor of the caretaker government (title given to the Interim Prime Minister) of Bangladesh since January 12, 2007; former Governor of Bangladesh Bank, the central bank of the country, responsible for making the country's monetary policies; obtained Masters in development economics
 William C. Apgar 1968, United States Assistant Secretary of Housing and Urban Development for Housing under President Bill Clinton
 Kakha Baindurashvili, Minister of Finance of Georgia (2009–2011)
 Richard A. Ballinger 1884, U.S. Secretary of the Interior and Mayor of Seattle
 Tariq Banuri 1972, chairman of the Pakistan Higher Education Commission
 Richard Beckler 1962, general counsel of the General Services Administration
 William John Bennett 1965, Secretary of Education under President Ronald Reagan; appointed as the United States' first drug czar under President George H. W. Bush
 Justin Butterfield 1811, 12th Commissioner of the General Land Office 
 Ian Brzezinski 1986, Deputy Assistant Secretary of Defense for Europe and NATO policy under President George W. Bush
 Hikmet Çetin 1961, Deputy Prime Minister of Turkey, 20th Speaker of the Grand National Assembly, and former minister of foreign affairs
 Bainbridge Colby 1890, Secretary of State under Woodrow Wilson and founder of United States Progressive Party
 William Thaddeus Coleman III 1969, General Counsel of the Army under President Bill Clinton
 Ashley Deeks 1993, associate White House Counsel and deputy legal adviser to the U.S. National Security Council in the Biden administration
 Nikoloz Gagua 2013, Minister of Finance of Georgia (2018–Present)
 James A. Garfield 1856, 20th President of the United States
 James Rudolph Garfield 1885, U.S. Secretary of the Interior
 Pavlos Geroulanos, Minister of Culture of Greece (2009–2012)
 Don Graves 1992, nominee for United States Deputy Secretary of Commerce
 Ishrat Husain 1972, Governor of the State Bank of Pakistan
 P. B. Jayasundera 1980, Sri Lankan economist and former Permanent Secretary of the Ministry of Finance (Sri Lanka)
 Ahmad Kaikaus, Principal Secretary under Prime Minister Sheikh Hasina
 Ramon Lopez 1988, Secretary of Trade and Industry in the Philippines 
 Kathleen Merrigan 1982, United States Deputy Secretary of Agriculture from 2009 to 2013; named "100 Most Influential People in the World" by Time Magazine in 2010
 Ahmed Naseer 2007, Maldivian economist; State Minister of Finance in the Maldives
 Benjamin H. Read 1947, 1st United States Under Secretary of State for Management
 Randall Schriver 1989, Assistant Secretary of Defense for Asian and Pacific Security Affairs, CEO / President of Project 2049 Institute and founding partner of Armitage International, LLC
 John A. Shaw 1962, CEO / president of the American Overseas Clinic Corporation, Deputy Undersecretary of Defense for International Technology Security, Assistant Secretary of Commerce
 William Spriggs 1977, assistant secretary for policy at the Department of Labor
 Herbert Stein 1936, chairman of the Council of Economic Advisors
 Sardar Ahmad Nawaz Sukhera, Cabinet Secretary of Pakistan
 Arkhom Termpittayapaisith 1983, Finance Minister of Thailand (2020-)
 Margarito Teves 1968, secretary of Finance of the Philippines (2005–2010); received Masters from Williams Center for Development Economics 
 Goh Chok Tong, Prime Minister of Singapore (1990–2004); received Masters from Williams Center for Development Economics
 Christine Wormuth 1981, Under Secretary of Defense for Policy (2014–2018)
 Carina Vance Mafla 1999, Ecuador's Minister for Public Health 
 V-Nee Yeh 1981, member of Executive Council of Hong Kong

Royalty

 Prince Hussain Aga Khan 1997, Shia Muslim royalty
 Reza Pahlavi (would have been 1983), former crown prince of Iran; matriculated at Williams, but left after his freshman year due to the Iranian Revolution led by Ayatollah Ruhollah Khomeini

Judiciary and legal
A–M

 Francis W. H. Adams 1925, United States Attorney for the Southern District of New York
 George W. Anderson 1886, circuit judge, United States Court of Appeals for the First Circuit
 James Barker 1860, Justice of the Massachusetts Supreme Judicial Court
 Samuel Betts 1806, judge, United States District Court for the Southern District of New York
 Eric Bjornlund 1980, co-founder and president of Democracy International
 Reuben P. Boise 1843, 9th Associate Justice of the Oregon Supreme Court, 5th Chief Justice of the Oregon Supreme Court
 Curtis Bok 1918, judge, justice of the Pennsylvania Supreme Court
 Bennett Boskey 1935, a lawyer who clerked for Judge Learned Hand and for two U.S. Supreme Court justices, Stanley Forman Reed and Chief Justice Harlan F. Stone
 Henry Shaw Briggs 1844, Justice for the Central Berkshire District Court
 William B. Brown 1934, Ohio Supreme Court Associate Justice
 Janet H. Brown 1973, executive director of the Commission on Presidential Debates
 Alonzo P. Carpenter 1849, Associate Justice of the New Hampshire Supreme Court from 1881 to 1896, Chief Justice of that court from 1896 to 1898
 Charles Clapp 1945, judge, United States Tax Court
 Edgar E. Clark 1878, chief executive of Order of Railway Conductors and served on the Interstate Commerce Commission
 William Thaddeus Coleman III 1969, General Counsel of the Army under President Bill Clinton
 James Denison Colt 1838, Associate Justice of the Massachusetts Supreme Judicial Court (1865–1866, 1868–1881)
 David Orgon Coolidge, founder of the Marriage Law Project
 Gordon Davis 1963, American lawyer at Venable LLP; prominent leader in New York City
 Dickinson Richards Debevoise 1948, Senior Judge, United States District Court for the District of New Jersey
 Charles Dewey (Indiana judge) 1806, Justice of the Indiana Supreme Court (1836-1847)
 Charles Augustus Dewey 1811, Justice of the Massachusetts Supreme Judicial Court Joseph A. Diclerico, Jr. 1963, judge, United States District Court for the District of New Hampshire
 Anita Earls 1981, associate justice of the North Carolina Supreme Court
 Robert H. Edmunds Jr., former associate justice of the North Carolina Supreme Court
 Morris Leopold Ernst 1909, lawyer and co-founder American Civil Liberties Union
 David Dudley Field II 1825, lawyer and reformer who made major contributions to the development of American civil procedure
 Stephen J. Field 1837, associate justice of the U.S. Supreme Court and chief architect of the constitutional theory that protected industry from Federal regulation during the rapid industrialization that followed the American Civil War
 Vincent J. Fuller 1952, American lawyer known for defending John Hinckley, Jr., Jimmy Hoffa, and Mike Tyson
 Lee Parsons Gagliardi 1941, judge, United States District Court for the Southern District of New York
 William Ball Gilbert 1868, judge, United States Court of Appeals for the Ninth Circuit
George H. Goodrich 1949, justice, Superior Court of the District of Columbia
 Madeline Hughes Haikala 1986, United States District Judge, Northern District of Alabama
 Raymond Headen (Class of 1984), Judge on the 8th District Court of Appeals of Ohio
 Jameel Jaffer 1994, director of the national civil liberties project at ACLU
 Robert Joseph Kelleher 1935, Senior Judge, United States District Court for the Central District of California
 Daniel Kellogg 1810, United States Attorney for the District of Vermont (1829–1841) and Justice of the Vermont Supreme Court (1845–1850)
 Nikolas Kerest 1994, lawyer, nominee to serve as the United States Attorney for the District of Vermont, current Assistant United States Attorney 
 Lina Khan 2010, Pakistani-American jurist, current Chairperson of Federal Trade Commission
 John Milton Killits 1880, judge, United States District Court for the Northern District of Ohio
 Rives Kistler 1971, associate justice, Oregon Supreme Court
 Anthony T. Kronman 1968, dean (1994–2004) and Sterling Professor of Law, Yale Law School
 Kenneth L. Marcus 1988, staff director, U.S. Commission on Civil Rights (2004–2008)
 David Markus 1994, deputy chief counsel in the New York State Judiciary; Judicial Referee in the New York Supreme Court; co-chair of ALEPH: Alliance for Jewish Renewal; co-rabbi of Temple Beth-El of City Island
 Edward Cochrane McLean 1924, judge, United States District Court for the Southern District of New York
 Paul Michel 1963, chief judge, United States Court of Appeals for the Federal Circuit
 Lawrence Mitchell 1978, dean, Case Western University School of Law
 George Morell 1807, chief justice of the Michigan Supreme Court

N–Z

Edgar J. Nathan 1913, Manhattan Borough President and Judge of the New York Supreme Court
 Addison Niles 1852, associate justice of the Supreme Court of California
Arthur Nims 1945, Senior Judge of the United States Tax Court
 Charles Cooper Nott Jr. 1890, judge of the New York General Sessions Court
 Abram Baldwin Olin 1835, judge, United States District Court for the District of Columbia
 William T. Quillen, 1956, justice, Supreme Court of Delaware
 Norman Redlich 1947, dean of NYU Law School and special assistant on the Warren Commission
 Meile Rockefeller 1977, American lawyer and drug law reformer
 Howard Frederic Sachs 1947, Senior Judge, United States District Court for the Western District of Missouri
 Silas Sanderson 1846, seventh chief justice of California
 Benjamin R. Sheldon 1831, justice of the Illinois Supreme Court
 Jeffrey Sutton 1983, circuit judge, United States Court of Appeals for the Sixth Circuit
 Samuel A. Talcott 1809, Attorney General of New York (1821–1829)
 Telford Taylor 1928, prosecutor of Nazis at the Nuremberg Trials, General in the U.S. Army, and professor of law at Columbia University and Yeshiva University's Cardozo School of Law
 Jackson Temple 1851, associate justice of the Supreme Court of California
 Jon S. Tigar 1984, judge, United States District Court for the Northern District of California
 Charles K. Williams 1800, chief justice of the Vermont Supreme Court
 Edward E. Wilson 1892, assistant state attorney, Cook County, Illinois (1912–1947)
 John F. Wharton 1916, American lawyer, founding partner of Paul, Weiss, Rifkind, Wharton & Garrison
 Gregory Howard Woods 1991, judge, general counsel for United States Department of Energy 
 Frank Wozencraft 1949, Assistant Attorney General in charge of the Office of Legal Counsel in the United States Justice Department

Medicine

 Ross J. Baldessarini 1959, American psychopharmacologist, Director of the International Consortium for Bipolar & Psychotic Disorders Research at McLean Hospital and Professor of Psychiatry (Neuroscience) at Harvard Medical School
 David Bellinger 1971, professor of neurology at Harvard Medical School and professor in the Department of Environmental Health at Harvard School of Public Health
 William F. Bernhard, M.D. 1944, American cardiovascular surgeon and cardiovascular researcher at Boston Children's Hospital
 Richard Besser, M.D., 1981, former acting director, Centers for Disease Control and Prevention
 Walter Bortz II, M.D., 1951, professor at Stanford Medical School; author of books on aging
 Louis R. Caplan, M.D., 1958, physician and professor of neurology at Harvard Medical School
 John B. Chapin 1850, American physician and mental hospital administrator; advocate for humane and appropriate treatment of mentally ill patients
 Barton Childs, M.D., 1938, pediatrician and geneticist at Johns Hopkins
 Henry H. Childs 1802, president of Berkshire Medical College
 Albert Coons, M.D., 1933, pathologist-immunologist; recipient of the 1959 Albert Lasker Award in Basic Research
 Toby Cosgrove 1962, CEO and president of the Cleveland Clinic
 Benjamin L. Ebert, M.D., Chair of Medical Oncology at the Dana–Farber Cancer Institute and the George P. Canellos, MD and Jean S. Canellos Professor of Medicine at Harvard Medical School 
 Nathaniel Bright Emerson 1865, medical physician and author of Hawaiian mythology
 Jonathan Fielding, M.D., 1964, director of the Los Angeles County Department of Public Health
 William Goodell 1851, M.D. notable gynecologist
 Robert E. Gould 1946, clinical professor of psychiatry at New York Medical College and chief of adolescent services at Bellevue Hospital
 Gabriel Grant 1848, American doctor and Union Army major; awarded the Medal of Honor
 Leston Havens 1947, pioneer in the establishment of hospital psychopharmacology units; directed the psychiatry residency program at Cambridge Hospital
 Stuart B. Levy 1960, American researcher and physician; first advocate for greater awareness of antibiotic resistance 
 Dr. Jay Loeffler 1977, chair of the Department of Radiation Oncology at Massachusetts General Hospital; highly distinguished physician in oncology
 Herbert Louis 1950, American orthopedic surgeon and billionaire
 Matthias Nicoll Jr. 1889, American physician and New York State Health Commissioner
 Rajveer Purohit 1993, Director of Reconstructive Urology at Icahn School of Medicine at Mount Sinai
 Michael Roizen, M.D., author of best-seller You: The Owner's Manual; chairman of RealAge, Inc.; former dean, Syracuse University Medical School; administrator at the Cleveland Clinic
 Martin A. Samuels 1967, American physician, neurologist, and teacher of medicine
 Craig R. Smith, M.D., 1970, professor of surgery at Columbia University Medical School, who led the medical team that performed open heart surgery on President Bill Clinton.
 Norman Spack, M.D., 1965, pediatric endocrinologist and assistant professor of pediatrics at Harvard Medical School
 Henry Reed Stiles, 1876, superintendent of the State Homeopathic Asylum for the Insane; author of several  historical and genealogical works
 Richard P. Usatine 1978, professor of family and community medicine; national recipient of the Humanism in Medicine Award by the Association of American Medical Colleges

Military

 Samuel C. Armstrong 1862, educator; commissioned officer in the Union Army during the American Civil War
 Erastus Newton Bates 1853, Brevet Brigadier General in the American Civil War
 Lewis Benedict 1837, colonel of the 162nd New York Volunteer Infantry; killed at the Battle of Pleasant Hill
 Henry Shaw Briggs 1844, brigadier general in the Union Army during the American Civil War
 Stephen Clarey 1962, United States Navy admiral commanding during Operation Desert Shield
 Warren "Bunge" Cook 1998, Current Commander of the 2nd Battalion, 4th Marines
 Edward Peck Curtis 1917 (dropped out to serve in World War I), major general and chief of staff, U. S. Strategic Air Force in Europe during World War II
 Henry Eugene Davies, brigadier general of the Union Army during the American Civil War
 Hasbrouck Davis 1845, American general from Massachusetts
 Myles C. Fox 1939, awarded the Navy Cross for his heroic actions during World War II
 Gabriel Grant 1848, American doctor and Union Army major; awarded the Medal of Honor
 Truman Seymour 1865, major general and later painter; received his A.M. degree
 George R. C. Stuart 1946, president of the Virginia Bar Association, member of the Virginia House of Delegates
 Mark L. Tidd 1977, 25th Chief of Chaplains of the United States Navy from 2010 to 2014
 William Bradford Turner 1914, awarded the Medal of Honor posthumously for actions in France 1918
 Albert William Tweedy Jr., United States Marine Corps aviator; USS Tweedy named in his honor
 Charles White Whittlesey 1905, awarded Medal of Honor for his actions as commander of the famed Lost Battalion of World War I
 Clark Williams 1892, World War I veteran; awarded Conspicuous Service Cross
 Ephraim Williams Jr., benefactor of Williams College; colonel in the Massachusetts militia; killed in action during the Battle of Lake George in the French and Indian War
 Edwin B. Wheeler 1939, General of the United States Marine Corps; served in three wars

Music

 Kristen Anderson-Lopez 1994, Academy Award-winning songwriter
 Caitlin Canty 2004, singer/songwriter 
 Chris Collingwood 1989, Fountains of Wayne member
 Darlingside, indie folk band founded in 2009 by Don Mitchell, Auyon Mukharji, Harris Paseltiner, and David Senft while undergraduates at Williams
 Kris Delmhorst, singer-songwriter
 William Finn 1974, Broadway composer of musicals, including  Falsettos and The 25th Annual Putnam County Spelling Bee; winner of the Tony Award
 John R. Graham, American film composer
 Judd Greenstein 2001, composer; co-director, New Amsterdam Records 
 Edward Danforth Hale 1880, music school pedagogue in piano, collegiate music school dean at Colorado College; major proponent of standardized music education in public schools
 Will Holt 1951, singer-songwriter
 Jason Howland 1993, composer of the Broadway musical Little Women, which opened in January 2005 at the Virginia Theatre
 Marcus Hummon 1984, Nashville-based singer-songwriter; twice nominated for a Grammy Award, won for Best Country Song ("Bless the Broken Road", performed by Rascal Flatts) in 2006; sometimes performs with a band called Redwing
 Art Lande 1969, jazz pianist and composer
 Chris Lightcap 1993, bassist, composer and bandleader
 Alastair Moock 1995, folk and children's musician
 John Morris Russell 1982, symphony conductor
 Adam Schlesinger 1989, Fountains of Wayne and Ivy member; Grammy and Emmy award winner
 Stephen Sondheim 1950, Broadway composer of musicals
 Leehom Wang 1998, singer-songwriter and actor in East Asia
 Brian Wecht 1997, Ninja Sex Party keyboardist and internet personality
 Jesse Winchester 1966, singer-songwriter
 Nick Zammuto 1999, of The Books

Religion

 Samuel James Andrews 1839, lawyer, Congregational clergyman, and writer
 Morris F. Arnold 1936, suffragan bishop of the Episcopal Diocese of Massachusetts
 Rachel Barenblat 1996, poet, blogger and rabbi 
 Boon Tuan Boon-Itt 1889, early leader in the Protestant Christian community of Thailand
 Charles F. Boynton 1928, Bishop of the Episcopal Diocese of Puerto Rico 
 Joab Brace 1854, American minister
 Nathan Brown 1830, American missionary to India and abolitionist
 Dan Cohn-Sherbok 1966, Jewish theologian and author on religion 
 Wallace E. Conkling, 7th bishop of the Episcopal Diocese of Chicago
 Samuel Warren Dike, Congregational clergyman and early advocate of divorce reform
 John Dunbar (missionary) 1826, Missionary to Pawnee indigenous peoples of Nebraska
 Henry Martyn Field 1838, author and clergyman 
 David Dudley Field I ~1804, American congregational clergyman, historical writer
 Samuel Fisher 1799, educator at Deerfield Academy and American clergyman
 Washington Gladden 1859, Congregational church pastor and leading member of the Progressive Movement
 Nathaniel Herrick Griffin 1836, American Presbyterian minister
 Gordon Hall 1808, one of the first two American Board of Commissioners for Foreign Missions; instrumental in founding the first American overseas missions
 Harvey Rexford Hitchcock 1828, Protestant missionary to Hawaii
 Henry Richard Hoisington 1823, missionary on the American Board of Commissioners for Foreign Missions to Ceylon
 Horace Holley 1799, American unitarian minister and president of Transylvania University
 Horace Holley (Baha'i) 1909, Hand of the Cause of the Bahá’í Faith
 John McClellan Holmes 1853, Christian minister and author
 Samuel Johnson Howard 1973, 8th bishop of the Episcopal Diocese of Florida
 Charles W. Huntington 1876, notable Congregational clergyman
 Charles McEwen Hyde 1852, American missionary to Hawaii
 Hamilton Hyde Kellogg 1921, fifth bishop of Minnesota in The Episcopal Church
 Jonas King 1816, Congregational clergyman and missionary to Greece
 Harry R. Jackson Jr., African-American Christian preacher and senior pastor at Hope Christian Church
 Joseph Horsfall Johnson 1870, 1st Bishop of Los Angeles in The Episcopal Church; founder of The Bishop's School (La Jolla) and trustee of Pomona College
 Edward W. Jones 1951, 9th Bishop of Indianapolis, 1977–1997
 Timothy Lull 1965, president of Pacific Lutheran Theological Seminary
 David Belden Lyman 1828, American missionary to Hawaii; opened boarding school for Hawaiians
 Jeb Stuart Magruder 1958, White House official involved in the Watergate scandal; later became a Presbyterian minister
 David Markus 1994, American attorney and co-chair of ALEPH: Alliance for Jewish Renewal; co-rabbi of Temple Beth-El of City Island
 Samuel John Mills 1805, founding member of the American Board of Commissioners for Foreign Missions and the American Missionary movement; founding member of the American Colonization Society
 Nicholas Murray (Presbyterian) 1826, Moderator of the General Assembly of the Presbyterian Church in the United States of America
 Norman Nash 1915, tenth bishop of Massachusetts in The Episcopal Church
 Samuel I. Prime 1829, American clergyman, traveler, and writer
 Luther Rice attended 1807–1810, Baptist minister and American missionary to India; namesake of Luther Rice University and helped establish George Washington University
 William Richards 1815, American missionary and politician in the Kingdom of Hawaii
 Thomas Robbins 1796, Congregational minister and first librarian of the Connecticut Historical Society
 Charles Seymour Robinson 1849, American pastor and compiler of hymns
 Eleazer Root 1821, educator and Episcopal priest
 Francis Bowes Sayre Jr. 1937, dean of the Washington National Cathedral
 Michael Scanlan 1953, Roman Catholic priest
 Lucius Edwin Smith 1843, United States lawyer, editor, clergyman, and educator
 John Todd (author) 1845, American minister and author
 David Jewett Waller, Sr. 1834, minister, entrepreneur and civic leader
 Preston Washington 1970, prominent pastor and minister in New York City
 William Farrar Weeks 1864, coadjutor bishop of the Episcopal Diocese of Vermont
 John William Yeomans 1828, Lafayette College president 1841–1844, Moderator of the General Assembly of the Presbyterian Church 1860

Science, technology, and engineering

 Robert Grant Aitken 1892, astronomer, director of Lick Observatory; compiled comprehensive catalog of double stars
 Albert LeRoy Andrews 1899, former president of the Sullivant Moss Society, renamed in 1970 the American Bryological and Lichenological Society
 Edward Bartow 1892, American chemist and an expert in the field of sanitary chemistry
 Justin Brande 1939, American conservationist and farmer; co-founded Vermont Natural Resources Council
 Richard M. Brett 1925, American conservationist and author
 William Keith Brooks 1870, American zoologist and founder of the Chesapeake Zoological Laboratory
 A. J. Bernheim Brush 1966, American computer scientist known for studying human-computer interaction; co-chair of CRA-W 
 John M. Darby 1831, botanist; created the first catalogue of flora of the southeastern United States
 Chester Dewey 1810, botanist
 Amos Eaton 1799, American botanist and geologist
 Ebenezer Emmons 1818, American geologist
 Alexander L. Fetter 1958, director of the Laboratory for Advanced Materials; former chair of the Physics Department, Stanford University (1985–1990)
 Louis Fieser 1920, Harvard chemistry professor and inventor
 Harry L. Fisher 1909, rubber chemist; 69th president of the American Chemical Society
 Christopher Flavin, president emeritus of the Worldwatch Institute
 John J. Gilbert 1959, Recipient of the 2003 A.C. Redfield Lifetime Achievement Award; major contributor to the fields of ecology and biology
 Ralph E. Gomory 1950, president of the Alfred P. Sloan Foundation; director of research for IBM; National Medal of Science Winner, 1988
 Chapman Grant 1910, biologist and herpetologist; grandson of U.S. President Ulysses S. Grant
 J. T. Gulick (1855–1859), evolutionary biologist
 G. Stanley Hall 1867, the father of American psychology; first American to be awarded a Doctor of Psychology
 William Higinbotham 1932, physicist; credited with creating the first video game
 Mahlon Hoagland 1944, former scientific director at Worcester Foundation for Biomedical Research; discovered transfer RNA
 George William Hunter 1896, author of Civic Biology, the textbook at the heart of the Scopes Trial
 Janet Iwasa 1999, cell biologist and animator
 Margaret D. Lowman 1975, pioneered the science of canopy ecology; director of Global Initiatives and Senior Scientist for Plant Conservation at the California Academy of Sciences
 John Sterling Kingsley 1876, biologist and zoologist 
 Daniel Kleppner 1953, physicist; National Medal of Science Winner, 2006
 James Ross MacDonald 1944, Winner of the 1988 IEEE Edison Medal; instrumental in building up the Central Research laboratories of Texas Instruments
 Michael Cary McCune 1967, software architect of real time air defense software at Litton Data Systems and co-founder of Command Control Communications Corporation (4C's)
 Terris Moore 1929, famous mountaineer
 Edward Morley 1860, co-performed the Michelson–Morley experiment
 James Orton 1855, American explorer and naturalist; contributed much to the knowledge of South America and the Amazon Basin
 Arthur Newton Pack 1913, founder of the American Nature Association
 William Ruddiman 1964, palaeoclimatologist 
 Lewis Morris Rutherfurd 1834, astronomer and pioneering astrophotographer  
 Truman Henry Safford 1854, astronomer, observatory director, human calculator
 Samuel Hubbard Scudder 1847, American entomologist and paleontologist; founder of American insect paleontology
 Henry Augustus Ward 1856, American geologist and naturalist
 Henry Baldwin Ward 1885, American zoologist
 David Ames Wells 1850, American engineer, economist, and textbook author
 Ethan Zuckerman 1993, co-founder of Tripod.com; founder of Geekcorps; fellow at the Berkman Center for Internet and Society

Sports

 Tala Abujbara 2014, Qatari Olympic rower
 Mike Bajakian 1996, quarterbacks coach, Tampa Bay Buccaneers (since 2015)
 Hanna Beattie 2017, American ice hockey forward for Connecticut Whale
 Benny Boynton 1921, football player; named to Walter Camp's All-American teams in 1919 and 1920; played in the early years of the National Football League; member of the College Football Hall of Fame
 John Bray 1899, Bronze medalist at the Olympic Games in Paris
 Jack Wright 1893, American football coach
 Ethan Brooks 1996, former National Football League offensive lineman
 Hal Brown 1922, Olympic athlete; won Gold at the 1920 Summer Olympics
 Dan Calichman 1990, Major League Soccer All-Star
 Henry Clarke (baseball) 1897, American baseball player
 Dave Clawson 1989, college football head coach, Wake Forest University
 Dick Colman 1936, Princeton University football head coach (1957–1968); member of the College Football Hall of Fame
 Jim Duquette 1988, senior vice president of baseball operations for the Baltimore Orioles
 Pat Duquette 1993, head coach, University of Massachusetts Lowell basketball (since 2013)
 Sean Gleeson (American football) 2007, quarterbacked Williams Ephs football from 2003 to 2006, currently the offensive coordinator and quarterbacks coach for Oklahoma State Cowboys football under Head Coach Mike Gundy.
 Henry Greer 1921, Men's field hockey player
 Will Hardy 2010, American professional basketball coach; current Head Coach of the Utah Jazz
 Jeff Hastings 1981, American former ski jumper
 Bob Hatch 1901, American football coach; former head coach at Colgate University
 John W. Hollister 1893, American football coach; head coach at Beloit College, Ole Miss, and Morningside College
 Charles P. Hutchins 1894, American football coach
 John Jay 1938, Rhodes Scholar and American skiing pioneer; invented the ski film in its modern form
 Jonathan Kraft 1986, operator, investor and owner's representative to the New England Patriots, New England Revolution and Gillette Stadium; chief operating officer of The Kraft Group
 Robert Leavitt 1907, Olympic gold medalist in 110-meter hurdles
 Jack Maitland 1970, football player; running back in the National Football League in the 1970s; earned a Super Bowl ring with the Baltimore Colts in Super Bowl V
 Jack Mills 1911, professional baseball player for the Cleveland Indians
 Leslie Milne (field hockey) 1979, American Olympic field hockey athlete; won Bronze at the 1984 Summer Olympics
 Kevin Morris 1986, head coach, University of Massachusetts football team (2009–2011); Yale Offensive Coordinator (2012 & 2013); Monmouth University (2014 to Present)
 Angus Morrison (canoeist), American canoeist
 Samuel B. Newton 1880, American football player and coach at Pennsylvania State University, Lafayette College, Lehigh University, and Williams College
 Robert Nutting 1984, chairman, CEO, owner of the Pittsburgh Pirates
 Coach Ogilvie, head football coach at New York University (1899)
 Frank "Buck" O'Neill 1902, College Football Hall of Fame coach
 Dave Paulsen 1987, head coach, George Mason University men's basketball; coached Williams to 2003 Division III national championship
 Frank Pergolizzi, athletic director at Husson College
 Scott Perry, former defensive back in the National Football League; played four seasons with the Cincinnati Bengals
 Robert L. "Nob" Rauch 1980, former executive director of the Ultimate Players Association; president of the World Flying Disc Federation; member of the Ultimate Hall of Fame
 Duncan Robinson 2017, professional basketball player for the Miami Heat (2018 to Present)
 Tom Roe 1964, American hockey player
 Frederick Bushnell "Jack" Ryder 1892, first paid head coach, Ohio State Buckeyes
 Richard C. Squires 1953, notable tennis, frontenis, squash, and platform tennis player
 George Steinbrenner 1952, owner of the New York Yankees
 Harold Z. Steinbrenner 1991, general partner of New York Yankees
 Khari Stephenson 2004, Major League Soccer and Jamaica national football team player
 Frank Stola 2021, professional American Football player for the Cottbus Crayfish of the Regionalliga Ost
 Rafael Stone 1994, general manager of the Houston Rockets
 Fay Vincent 1960, former Major League Baseball commissioner
 Romel V. Wallen 2004, Jamaica national football team player
 Michael Weiner 1983, general counsel for the Major League Baseball Players Association
 Chris Willenken 1997, American bridge player

Trustees
 Michael R. Eisenson 1977, chairman of the board of trustees; CEO and founder of Charlesbank Capital Partners
 Ole Andreas Halvorsen 1986, founder and CEO of Viking Global Investors
 Clarence Otis, Jr 1977, CEO of Darden Restaurants
 Martha Williamson 1977, CEO of MoonWater Productions
 Gregory Howard Woods 1991, American judge of the United States District Court for the Southern District of New York

Writing, journalism, and advocacy
A–F

 Peter Abrahams 1968, writer of crime thrillers
 Henry Mills Alden 1857, managing editor of Harper's Magazine
 Rachel Axler 1999, four-time Emmy Award winner; television comedy writer and playwright
 William Chauncey Bartlett, writer, lawyer and abolitionist
 James Phinney Baxter III, won the 1947 Pulitzer Prize for History for Scientists Against Time
 Stephen Birmingham 1950, writer
 Lesley M.M. Blume 1998, American award-winning writer and journalist
 Daniel I. Bolnick 1996, editor-in-chief of the journal The American Naturalist
 Paul Boocock 1988, writer and theater actor
 Charles Brackett 1915, American novelist, screenwriter, and film producer; winner of Academy Award for Best Original Screenplay and Academy Award for Best Adapted Screenplay
 Sterling Brown 1922, poet
 Herbert Brucker 1921, Former editor-in-chief of the Hartford Courant; national advocate for freedom of the press
 Erin Burnett 1998, anchor of CNN's Erin Burnett OutFront
 Richard M. Brett 1925, American conservationist and author
 William Cullen Bryant 1814, poet; editor-in-chief New-York Evening Post (later the New York Post) (1828–1878)
 Michelle Cuevas 2004, author of children's books
 Mika Brzezinski 1989, reporter on MSNBC; daughter of Zbigniew Brzezinski, National Security Advisor under U.S. President Jimmy Carter
 Kristin Cashore, author of Graceling, Fire, and Bitterblue
 Christopher Clarey 1986, American journalist and global sports columnist
 Hal Crowther 1966, author and essayist
 Dominick Dunne 1949, author
 Max Eastman 1905, writer and political activist
 Rosemary Esehagu 2003, Nigerian writer and author of The Looming Fog
 Jiayang Fan 2006, Chinese-American journalist and staff writer for The New Yorker
 Eugene Field, American writer and children's poet
 Peter Filkins, American poet and literary translator; teaches literature at Bard College
 Philip L. Fradkin 1957, American environmentalist, historian, journalist, and author
 Naoko Funayama 1995, rinkside reporter for Boston Bruins games on the New England Sports Network

G–M

 Dorothy Gambrell, cartoonist of online comic strip Cat and Girl
 Joshua Glenn 1989, American editor and writer
 Ralph Graves (writer), American reporter, editor, and writer
 Michael Joseph Gross 1992, American author and journalist; speechwriter for William Weld
 Matt Gutman 2000, ABC News correspondent 
 Barbara Bradley Hagerty, American journalist
 Nathan Hale 1804, newspaper publisher who introduced editorial content as a feature
 Joseph C. Harsch 1927, American journalist
 David G. Hartwell 1963, editor of science fiction and fantasy literature; described as "perhaps the single most influential book editor of the past forty years in the American science fiction publishing world"
 Hunt Hawkins 1965, professor at University of South Florida; Poet and winner of the Agnes Lynch Starrett Poetry Prize
 Isaac Henderson, novelist, dramatist, publisher of the New York Evening Post
 Akua Lezli Hope, artist, poet, and writer
 Frank Huyler 1988, American poet, writer, and physician
Naomi Jackson 2002, American novelist 
 Julie Joosten 2002, acclaimed American-Canadian poet
 Dan Josefson 1996, writer; winner of the Whiting Award
 John Kifner 1963, writer and editor at The New York Times
 Donald S. Klopfer, American publisher and co-founder of Random House
 Edward J. Larson 1974, 1998 Pulitzer Prize for History winner for Summer for the Gods: The Scopes Trial and America's Continuing Debate over Science and Religion
 John Howard Lawson 1914, playwright and screenwriter; first president of the Writers Guild of America, West; one of the Hollywood Ten
 Tim Layden 1978, senior writer for Sports Illustrated for 25 years, covering football, equestrian racing, and the Olympics.
 Clifton Leaf 1985, editor-in-chief of Fortune Magazine
 Tod Lippy 1987, founding editor and executive director of Esopus
 Jim Lobe 1970, American journalist and the Washington Bureau Chief of the Inter Press Service
 William Loeb III 1927, publisher of the Manchester Union Leader
 Fiona Maazel 1997, novelist
 Hamilton Wright Mabie 1867, American essayist, editor, critic, and lecturer; first president of the North American Interfraternity Conference
 Dave Marash 1964, Nightline correspondent
 Joseph McElroy 1951, author
 Jay McInerney 1976, author of Bright Lights, Big City
 Bethany McLean 1992, author of The Smartest Guys in the Room about the collapse of Enron
 Richard Meryman 1948, journalist, biographer, and editor; interviewed numerous luminaries for his work at Life
 L. E. Modesitt, Jr. 1965, author of science fiction and fantasy; noted for his The Saga of Recluce series
 R. A. Montgomery 1958, author/creator of the Choose Your Own Adventure series
 Charles Morton 1921, associate editor of The Atlantic Monthly
 Dennis Murphy 1969, four-time Emmy winner for excellence in news reporting; NBC News Correspondent

N–Z

 Sonia Nazario 1982, Pulitzer Prize for Feature Writing winner
 Rory Nugent 1975, American explorer and writer; mounted expeditions along the Congo and Brahmaputra River
 Robert C. O'Brien (author), American novelist and journalist
 Kira Obolensky, American playwright and recipient of a 1997 Guggenheim Fellowship
 Rollo Ogden 1878, American journalist; editor of The New York Times and New York Post
 Lizzie O'Leary 2001, American journalist; host of Marketplace Weekend
 George Oppenheimer 1922, American journalist, playwright, and founder of The Viking Press
 Robert Wilson Patterson 1871, editor-in-chief of the Chicago Tribune; president of the Tribune Company
 Bliss Perry 1882, editor of The Atlantic Monthly
 Victoria Price 1984, writer
 Samuel I. Prime 1829, editor of the New York Observer
 Claudia Rankine 1986, poet and playwright, 2016 MacArthur Fellow
 Wade Rathke 1970, editor-in-chief of Social Policy and founder of the Association of Community Organizations for Reform Now (ACORN)
 George Mather Richards 1902, American illustrator and painter
 Harvey Rice 1824, American poet and newspaperman (founded The Plain Dealer)
 Thomas Robbins (minister) 1796, first librarian of the Connecticut Historical Society
 Edward Payson Roe 1860, American novelist
 Stacy Schiff 1982, Pulitzer Prize for Biography or Autobiography winner
 Eric P. Schmitt 1982, Pulitzer Prize winner
 Horace Scudder 1858, American essayist and man of letters
 Salomón de la Selva 1913, Nicaraguan poet and honorary member of the Mexican Academy of Language
 Scott Shane 1976, American journalist and author; expert on the intelligence community
 Stuart Sherman 1904, American literary critic and editor
 Wendy Shalit 1997, author of A Return to Modesty and Girls Gone Mild
 David Shipley 1985, New York Times editor; former speechwriter for U.S. President Bill Clinton
 Harry James Smith 1902, American playwright
 Hedrick Smith 1955, 1974 Pulitzer Prize for International Reporting winner
 Lucius Edwin Smith 1843, United States lawyer, editor, clergyman, and educator
 John Lawson Stoddard 1871, American writer, hymn writer, lecturer
 Andy Straka, Shamus Award-winning American crime novelist
 Tui T. Sutherland 2000, Venezuelan-American children's book author; Jeopardy! champion
 John Toland 1936, writer
 Norah Vincent 1990, syndicated columnist; author of Self-Made Man
 Sean Saifa Wall, advocate for intersex rights; former president of Interact Advocates for Intersex Youth
 Charles Webb 1961, author of the novel The Graduate 
 Vanessa Wruble 1996, co-founder of the 2017 Women's March

See also

 List of people from Massachusetts

References

External links

 Williams Students Online

Lists of people by university or college in Massachusetts